Earl Sigurd may refer to

Sigurd Hlodvirsson, Earl of Orkney (circa 991–1014) 
Sigurd Haakonsson (circa 895–962), Earl of Lade
MV Earl Sigurd, a ferry in the Orkney Ferries fleet